Fred Jones may refer to:

Sports

American football
Fred Jones (linebacker, born 1965)
Fred Jones (wide receiver) (born 1967)
Freddie Jones (American football) (born 1974), American football tight end
Fred Jones (linebacker, born 1977)

Association football
Fred Jones (footballer, born 1867) (1867–1910), Wales international footballer
Fred Jones (footballer, born 1888) (1888–?), English footballer active in the 1900s and 1910s
Fred Jones (footballer, born 1898) (1898–?), English footballer active in the 1920s
Fred Jones (footballer, born 1909) (1909–1994), Welsh footballer
Fred Jones (footballer, born 1910) (1910–?), English footballer active in the 1930s
Fred Jones (footballer, born 1922) (1922–1989), English footballer active in the 1940s
Fred Jones (footballer, born 1938) (1938–2013), Welsh footballer

Other sports
Fred Jones (Australian footballer) (1918–1977), Australian rules footballer
Fred Jones (basketball) (born 1979), American basketball player
Fred Jones (rugby league) (1942–2021), Australian rugby league footballer

Other people
Fred Jones (1892–1971), American businessman, former chairman of Braniff International Airways
Fred Jones (politician) (1884–1966), New Zealand politician of the Labour Party
Freddie Jones (1927–2019), British actor
C. Fred Jones (1930–2015), American politician
Fred Jones Jr. (born 1948), American entrepreneur and entertainment producer
Fred W. Jones Jr. (1924–2000), American judge

Characters
Fred Jones (Scooby-Doo), a character in Scooby-Doo
Fred Jones (comics), a Marvel comic book character
Freddy Jones, a character in School of Rock 
Fred Jones, a character in two Ben Folds songs

See also
Freddy Jones Band, a roots rock band from Chicago, Illinois
Frederick Jones (disambiguation)